Luis Arana Urigüen (Santander, Cantabria, 14 February 1876 – Madrid, 7 June 1951) was a sailor from Spain, who represented his country at the 1928 Summer Olympics in Amsterdam, Netherlands.

Sources

References

External links
 

Sailors at the 1928 Summer Olympics – 6 Metre
Olympic sailors of Spain
1876 births
1951 deaths
Spanish male sailors (sport)
Sportspeople from Santander, Spain
Sportspeople from Bilbao
Sailors (sport) from the Basque Country (autonomous community)